Tejeshwar Singh (31 January 1947 – 15 December 2007) was an Indian publisher, journalist, newscaster and theater activist.

Early life and background
Singh was the son of Indian diplomat Gurbachan Singh, who served as an envoy to Switzerland, Bhutan and Pakistan.
He graduated from The Doon School and went on to study at Balliol College, University of Oxford.

Career
In 1981 he founded, along with George and Sara McCune, the Indian arm of the international publishing house SAGE Publications, which is now a prominent Indian publishing house. However, Singh was most well known to Indians as a famous newsreader on the nationwide television network, Doordarshan, during the 1980s and early 1990s. He reported discontinuing reading newspapers after Indira Gandhi declared emergency in India. He reported that Indira Gandhi personally approved the footage of Operation Blue Star in Golden Temple/Harmandir Sahib for news on Doordarshan.

He also acted as a main villain Deen Dayal in the well-known 1987 Hindi film Jalwa and played Ravi Uncle in Chai Pani Etc. in 2004.

Tejeshwar Singh died of a heart attack at his home in Mussoorie, India, on 15 December 2007. He was 60 when he died.

The Tejeshwar Singh Memorial Fellowships
SAGE Publications instituted the Tejeshwar Singh Memorial Fellowships in  2009 to honour Tejeshwar Singh, the Managing Director of SAGE India  for 25 years and doyen of the publishing industry in South Asia.  Every year, SAGE invites applications for the award of The Tejeshwar Singh Memorial  Fellowships in the following categories.
 Social Sciences
 Business & Management
 Media & Communication Studies

The duration of scholarship is one year. A stipend of rupees 50,000 a month Teje(50,000 X 12) with an  additional amount of rupees 50,000 can be claimed for travel during the tenure of  the fellowship. Total value of the Fellowship is rupees 6,50,000. The scholarship eligibility is open to all nationals of South Asian (SAARC)  countries, including those currently resident overseas.

References

External links

Hindustan Times: Publisher, newscaster Tejeshwar Singh dead
The Hindu: Tejeshwar Singh known for his baritone voice and perfect diction
Express India: Tejeshwar Singh, voice of DD news, passes away
SAGE Publications India
SAGE Publications main

1945 births
2007 deaths
Place of birth missing
Doordarshan journalists
Indian male voice actors
Indian television news anchors
The Doon School alumni
Alumni of Balliol College, Oxford
Indian publishers (people)
20th-century Indian journalists
Indian male journalists